The one-horse shay is a light, covered, two-wheeled carriage for two persons, drawn by a single horse. The body is chairlike in shape and has one seat for passengers positioned above the axle which is hung by leather braces from wooden springs connected to the shafts.

The one-horse shay is an American adaptation, originating in Union, Maine, of the French chaise. The one-horse shay is colloquially known in the US as a 'one-hoss shay'.

Etymology 
The English word shay is a back-formation from the French word chaise with the /z/ of that word taken as the plural ending -s. This is but one example of mistaking foreign singular words as if being English plurals; other examples include pea, cherry and sherry.

Whiskey variant 
A smaller and more lightly constructed version of the one-horse shay is called a chair or 'whiskey' because it can "whisk" around other carriages and pass them quickly.

Shay in literature 
American writer Oliver Wendell Holmes Sr. memorialized the shay in his satirical poem
 " or The Wonderful One-Hoss Shay". In the poem, a fictional deacon crafts the titular wonderful one-hoss shay in such a logical way that it could not break down. The shay is constructed from the very best of materials so that each part is as strong as every other part. In Holmes' humorous, yet "logical", twist, the shay endures for a hundred years (amazingly to the precise moment of the 100th anniversary of the Lisbon earthquake shock) then it "went to pieces all at once, and nothing first, — just as bubbles do when they burst". It was built in such a "logical way" that it ran for exactly one hundred years to the day.

Shay in economics 
In economics, the term "one-hoss shay" is used, following the scenario in Holmes' poem, to describe a model of depreciation, in which a durable product delivers the same services throughout its lifetime before failing with zero scrap value. A chair is a common example of such a product.

See also 
 Carriage

References

External links
The "One-Hoss Shay" by Oliver Wendell Holmes with illustrations by Howard Pyle. Contains extensive explanatory notes
The Deacon’s Masterpiece or The Wonderful "One-Hoss Shay": A Logical Story. Contains explanatory notes and poem info
The Deacon’s Masterpiece or The Wonderful "One-Hoss Shay": A Logical Story. Contains discussion of a practical lesson that can be obtained from the poem
"The Deacon's Masterpiece or The Wonderful One-Hoss Shay" read by Eddie Albert, American actor, (1906-2005). From the 1962 Caedmon album "Great American Poetry".
 

Carriages